Suzanne Lenglen and Elizabeth Ryan successfully defended their title, defeating Kitty McKane and Margaret Stocks in the final, 6–0, 6–4 to win the ladies' doubles tennis title at the 1922 Wimbledon Championships.

Draw

Finals

Top half

Bottom half

References

External links

Women's Doubles
Wimbledon Championship by year – Women's doubles
Wimbledon Championships - Doubles
Wimbledon Championships - Doubles